Gabriel López Rosado  is a Mexican politician affiliated with the PRD. He served as Deputy of the LXII Legislature of the Mexican Congress representing Oaxaca.

References

Date of birth missing (living people)
Living people
People from Oaxaca
Party of the Democratic Revolution politicians
21st-century Mexican politicians
Year of birth missing (living people)
Deputies of the LXII Legislature of Mexico
Members of the Chamber of Deputies (Mexico) for Oaxaca